Leo Sotorník (11 April 1926 in Vítkovice (Ostrava) – 14 March 1998 in Prague) was a Czech gymnast who competed in the 1948 Summer Olympics and in the 1952 Summer Olympics, as well as the 1950 World Artistic Gymnastics Championships and 1954 World Artistic Gymnastics Championships.

References

1926 births
1998 deaths
Czech male artistic gymnasts
Olympic gymnasts of Czechoslovakia
Gymnasts at the 1948 Summer Olympics
Gymnasts at the 1952 Summer Olympics
Olympic bronze medalists for Czechoslovakia
Olympic medalists in gymnastics
Sportspeople from Ostrava
Medalists at the 1948 Summer Olympics